Cradle of Humankind is an archeological site in South Africa.

The Cradle of Humankind or, alternatively Cradle of Humanity, Cradle of Mankind or Cradle of Man may also refer to:

Human history, the history of humanity
For prehistoric life, please see Stone Age or Prehistoric man
Human evolution, the biological origins of the human species
For the geographical origins of the human species, please see Recent African origin of modern humans and Multiregional origin of modern humans
 Earth, according to a famous quote by Konstantin Tsiolkovsky.
Creation myth, theological views on the origins of the human species
Cradle of civilization, areas where the first civilizations developed
Cradle of Man, a 2005 play by Melanie Marnich
"The Cradle of Humankind", a song by Flogging Molly from their 2011 album Speed of Darkness